Arpara Ideal High School is a secondary school in Arpara, Shalikha Upazila, Magura District, Bangladesh.

History
The school was established in 1945. In 2010, it ranked as one of the top ten secondary schools in Magura District. It was nationalized on 13 September 2018.

Campus
The school is situated on the west side of the Dhaka-Khulna Highway and southern part of river Fatki at Shalikha Upazila in Magura District.

References

High schools in Bangladesh
Educational institutions established in 1945
1945 establishments in India